The 2019 Arizona Diamondbacks season was the franchise's 21st season in Major League Baseball and their 21st season at Chase Field in Phoenix, Arizona as members of the National League West Division. They were managed by Torey Lovullo in his third season with the franchise.

The 2019 Diamondbacks were the first team in Major League history to have their road opener against one reigning pennant winner (Dodgers) and their home opener against the other (Red Sox) in the same season. Despite improving upon their 82–80 record from last season, the Diamondbacks were eliminated from postseason contention for the second consecutive year after a loss to the Cardinals on September 23.

The 2019 Diamondbacks were by one measure the "most average team" in baseball history. For 60 games, the Diamondbacks were within two games of .500 (plus or minus), an MLB record that surpassed a 56-game streak by the 2007 Oakland Athletics. The stretch lasted from June 18, when the Diamondbacks lost to the Colorado Rockies to fall to 38–36, through August 30, when they beat the Los Angeles Dodgers to improve to 69–66.

The Diamondbacks broke a league record alongside the Philadelphia Phillies this season for most home runs in one game, smashing a franchise record 8 home runs out of 13 total in a 13–8 win on June 10. Additionally, the Diamondbacks set a franchise record on September 24/25, when their game against the Cardinals lasted 19 innings, the longest game by innings played in Diamondbacks' history and, at 6 hours and 53 minutes from start to finish, the longest game ever played at Chase Field. Having used 30 players in this game, the Diamondbacks set another franchise record in that respect, and, with 25 strikeouts by Diamondbacks pitchers and 21 by Cardinals pitchers, both teams tied a Major League Baseball record for most strikeouts in a single game at 46, the game also marking only the second time in baseball history that two teams struck out 21 or more opponents in the same game. The Diamondbacks won the game, 3–2.

Offseason

Transactions

Season standings

National League West

National League Wild Card

Record vs. opponents

Game log

|- align="center" bgcolor=ffbbbb
| 1 || March 28 || @ Dodgers || 5–12 || Ryu (1–0) || Greinke (0–1) || — || 53,086 || 0–1 || L1
|- align="center" bgcolor=ccffcc
| 2 || March 29 || @ Dodgers || 5–4 (13) || Andriese (1–0) || García (0–1) || Holland (1) || 42,266 || 1–1 || W1
|- align="center" bgcolor=ffbbbb
| 3 || March 30 || @ Dodgers || 5–18 || Maeda (1–0) || Godley (0–1) || — || 50,626 || 1–2 || L1 
|- align="center" bgcolor=ffbbbb
| 4 || March 31 || @ Dodgers || 7–8 || Floro (1–0) || Hirano (0–1) || — || 43,815 || 1–3 || L2 
|- align="center" bgcolor=ccffcc
| 5 || April 1 || @ Padres || 10–3 || Kelly (1–0) || Strahm (0–1) || — || 18,683 || 2–3 || W1
|- align="center" bgcolor=ccffcc
| 6 || April 2 || @ Padres || 8–5 || Greinke (1–1) || Lauer (1–1) || Holland (2) || 22,504 || 3–3 || W2
|- align="center" bgcolor=ffbbbb
| 7 || April 3 || @ Padres || 1–4 || Lucchesi (2–0) || Ray (0–1) || — || 19,376 || 3–4 || L1
|- align="center" bgcolor=ccffcc
| 8 || April 5 || Red Sox || 15–8 || Godley (1–1) || Porcello (0–2) || — || 48,338 || 4–4 || W1 
|- align="center" bgcolor=ccffcc
| 9 || April 6 || Red Sox || 5–4 || Holland (1–0) || Brewer (0–1) || — || 35,969 || 5–4 || W2
|- align="center" bgcolor=ffbbbb
| 10 || April 7 || Red Sox || 0–1 || Walden (1–0) || Kelly (1–1) || Brasier (2) || 31,565 || 5–5 || L1
|- align="center" bgcolor=ccffcc
| 11 || April 9 || Rangers || 5–4 || Andriese (2–0) || Leclerc (1–1) || — || 16,620 || 6–5 || W1
|- align="center" bgcolor=ffbbbb
| 12 || April 10 || Rangers || 2–5 || Lynn (1–1) || Chafin (0–1) || Bird (1) || 15,871 || 6–6 || L1
|- align="center" bgcolor=ffbbbb
| 13 || April 11 || Padres || 6–7 || Stammen (1–0) || Bradley (0–1) || Wingenter (1) || 15,449 || 6–7 || L2
|- align="center" bgcolor=ffbbbb
| 14 || April 12 || Padres || 1–2 || Reyes (1–0) || Weaver (0–1) || Yates (8) || 22,209 || 6–8 || L3
|- align="center" bgcolor=ffbbbb
| 15 || April 13 || Padres || 4–5 || Stammen (2–0) || Andriese (2–1) || Yates (9) || 27,256 || 6–9 || L4
|- align="center" bgcolor=ccffcc
| 16 || April 14 || Padres || 8–4 || Greinke (2–1) || Lauer (2–2) || — || 25.489 || 7–9 || W1
|- align="center" bgcolor=ccffcc
| 17 || April 16 || @ Braves || 9–6 || Hirano (1–1) || Minter (0–2) || Holland (3) || 22,407 || 8–9 || W2
|- align="center" bgcolor=ccffcc
| 18 || April 17 || @ Braves || 3–2 || Bradley (1–1) || Biddle (0–1) || Holland (4) || 22,356 || 9–9 || W3
|- align="center" bgcolor=ccffcc
| 19 || April 18 || @ Braves || 4–1 || Weaver (1–1) || Soroka (0–1) || Hirano (1) || 24,193 || 10–9 || W4
|- align="center" bgcolor=ffbbbb
| 20 || April 19 || @ Cubs || 1–5 || Hendricks (1–3) || Kelly (1–2) || Strop (2) || 33,938 || 10–10 || L1
|- align="center" bgcolor=ccffcc
| 21 || April 20 || @ Cubs || 6–0 || Greinke (3–1) || Darvish (1–3) || Clarke (1) || 37,667 || 11–10 || W1
|- align="center" bgcolor=ffbbbb
| 22 || April 21 || @ Cubs || 1–2 || Strop (1–1) || Bradley (1–2) || — || 38,181 || 11–11 || L1 
|- align="center" bgcolor=ccffcc
| 23 || April 22 || @ Pirates || 12–4 || Andriese (3–1) || Crick (0–1) || — || 9,233 || 12–11 || W1 
|- align="center" bgcolor=ccffcc
| 24 || April 23 || @ Pirates || 2–1 || Weaver (2–1) || Williams (1–1) || Holland (5) || 8,558 || 13–11 || W2
|- align="center" bgcolor=ccffcc
| 25 || April 24 || @ Pirates || 11–2 || Kelly (2–2) || Lyles (2–1) || — || 9,450 || 14–11 || W3  
|- align="center" bgcolor=ccffcc
| 26 || April 25 || @ Pirates || 5–0 || Greinke (4–1) || Taillon (1–3) || — || 9,365 || 15–11 || W4
|- align="center" bgcolor=ccffcc
| 27 || April 26 || Cubs || 8–3 || Ray (1–1) || Hendricks (1–4) || Andriese (1) || 30,664 || 16–11 || W5
|- align="center" bgcolor=ffbbbb
| 28 || April 27 || Cubs || 1–9 || Darvish (2–3) || Godley (1–2) || — || 27,793 || 16–12 || L1  
|- align="center" bgcolor=ffbbbb
| 29 || April 28 || Cubs || 5–6 (15) || Chatwood (1–0) || Andriese (3–2) || Webster (1) || 29,477 || 16–13 || L2
|- align=“center” bgcolor=ccffcc
| 30 || April 30 || Yankees || 3–1 || Greinke (5–1) || Sabathia (1–1) || Holland (6) || 36,352 || 17–13 || W1
|-

|- align=“center” bgcolor=ccffcc
| 31 || May 1 || Yankees || 3–2 || Kelly (3–2) || Tanaka (2–3) || Holland (7) || 31,365 || 18–13 || W2
|- align=“center” bgcolor=ccffcc
| 32 || May 3 || @ Rockies || 10–9 || Ray (2–1) || Anderson (0–3) || Holland (8) || 29,574 || 19–13 || W3
|- align=“center” bgcolor=ccffcc
| 33 || May 4 || @ Rockies || 9–2 || Weaver (3–1) || Freeland (2–5) || — || 37,765 || 20–13 || W4
|- align="center" bgcolor=ffbbbb
| 34 || May 5 || @ Rockies || 7–8 || Oberg (1–0) || Bradley (1–3) || Davis (5) || 40,262 || 20–14 || L1
|- align="center" bgcolor=ffbbbb
| 35 || May 6 || @ Rays || 1–12 || Snell (3–3) || Kelly (3–3) || — || 8,124 || 20–15 || L2
|- align="center" bgcolor=ffbbbb
| 36 || May 7 || @ Rays || 3–6 || Beeks (2–0) || Clarke (0–1) || — || 8,059 || 20–16 || L3
|- align=“center” bgcolor=ccffcc
| 37 || May 8 || @ Rays || 3–2 (13) || Bradley (2–3) || Kolarek (2–1) || Godley (1) || 8,663 || 21–16 || W1 
|- align=“center” bgcolor=ccffcc
| 38 || May 9 || Braves || 3–2 (10) || Duplantier (1–0) || Minter (0–4) || — || 17,751 || 22–16 || W2
|- align="center" bgcolor=ffbbbb
| 39 || May 10 || Braves || 1–2 || Winkler (1–0) || López (0–1) || Jackson (3) || 21,932 || 22–17 || L1
|- align="center" bgcolor=ffbbbb
| 40 || May 11 || Braves || 4–6 || Gausman (2–3) || Kelly (3–4) || Venters (1) || 33,168 || 22–18 || L2 
|- align="center" bgcolor=ffbbbb
| 41 || May 12 || Braves || 3–5 || Fried (5–2) || Godley (1–3) || Jackson (4) || 27,460 || 22–19 || L3
|- align=“center” bgcolor=ccffcc
| 42 || May 13 || Pirates || 9–3 || Ray (3–1) || Kingham (1–1) || — || 15,418 || 23–19 || W1
|- align=“center“ bgcolor=ffbbbb
| 43 || May 14 || Pirates || 2–6 || Musgrove (2–4) || Weaver (3–2) || — || 21,047 || 23–20 || L1
|- align=“center” bgcolor=ccffcc
| 44 || May 15 || Pirates || 11–1 || Greinke (6–1) || Archer (1–3) || — || 17,258 || 24–20 || W1
|- align=“center” bgcolor=ccffcc
| 45 || May 17 || Giants || 7–0 || Kelly (4–4) || Samardzija (2–2) || — || 26,806 || 25–20 || W2
|- align=“center“ bgcolor=ffbbbb
| 46 || May 18 || Giants || 5–8 || Bumgarner (3–4) || Godley (1–4) || — || 25,014 || 25–21 || L1
|- align=“center” bgcolor=ffbbbb
| 47 || May 19 || Giants || 2–3 (10) || Dyson (2–0) || Hirano (1–2) || Smith (12) || 24,061 || 25–22 || L2
|- align=“center” bgcolor=ffbbbb
| 48 || May 20 || @ Padres || 1–2 || Paddack (4–2) || Weaver (3–3) || Yates (18) || 17,578 || 25–23 || L3
|- align=“center” bgcolor=ffbbbb
| 49 || May 21 || @ Padres || 2–3 || Strahm (2-3) || Greinke (6-2) || Yates (19) || 19,969 || 25–24 || L4
|- align=“center” bgcolor=ffbbbb
| 50 || May 22 || @ Padres || 2–5 || Lauer (3–4) || Kelly (4–5) || Yates (20) || 18,715 || 25-25 || L5
|- align=“center” bgcolor=ccffcc
| 51 || May 24 || @ Giants || 18–2 || Ray (4–1) || Pomeranz (1–5) || Godley (2) || 31,777 || 26–25 || W1
|- align=“center” bgcolor=ccffcc
| 52 || May 25 || @ Giants || 10–4 || Clarke (1–1) || Suarez (0–2) || — || 31,531 || 27–25 || W2
|- align=“center” bgcolor=ccffcc
| 53 || May 26 || @ Giants || 6–2 || Weaver (4–3) || Anderson (0–1) || Holland (9) || 37,017 || 28–25 || W3
|- align=“center” bgcolor=ffbbbb
| 54 || May 27 || @ Rockies || 3–4 || Oh (2–1) || Andriese (3–3) || — || 35,604 || 28–26 || L1
|- align=“center”  bgcolor=ffbbbb
| 55 || May 28 || @ Rockies || 2–6 || Díaz (1–0) || Kelly (4–6) || Bettis (1) || 21,583 || 28–27 || L2
|- align=“center” bgcolor=ffbbbb
| 56 || May 29 || @ Rockies || 4–5 || Hoffman (1–1) || Ray (4–2) || Oberg (1) || 24,261 || 28–28 || L3
|- align=“center” bgcolor=ffbbbb
| 57 || May 30 || @ Rockies || 10–11 (10) || Oh (3–1) ||  Hirano (1–3) || — || 30,371 || 28–29 || L4
|- align=“center” bgcolor=ffbbbb
| 58 || May 31 || Mets || 4–5 || Wheeler (5–3) || Andriese (3–4) || Gsellman (1) || 24,664 || 28–30 || L5
|-

|- align=“center” bgcolor=ccffcc
| 59 || June 1 || Mets || 6–5 (11) || Hirano (2–3) || Bashlor (0–3) || — || 34,888 || 29–30 || W1
|- align=“center” bgcolor=ccffcc
| 60 || June 2 || Mets || 7–1 || Kelly (5–6) || Matz (4–4) || — || 26,945 || 30–30 || W2
|- align=“center” bgcolor=ffbbbb
| 61 || June 3 || Dodgers || 1–3 || Buehler (6–1) || Ray (4–3) ||  Jansen (18) || 24,124 || 30–31 || L1
|- align=“center” bgcolor=ffbbbb
| 62 || June 4 || Dodgers || 0–9 || Ryu (9–1) || Clarke (1–2) || — || 29,784 || 30–32 || L2
|- align=“center” bgcolor=ccffcc
| 63 || June 5 || Dodgers || 3–2 (11) || Godley (2–4) || Alexander (3–2) || — || 22,753 || 31–32 || W1
|- align=“center” bgcolor=ccffcc
| 64 || June 7 || @ Blue Jays || 8–2 || Kelly (6–6) || Stroman (3–8) || — || 16,555 || 32–32 || W2
|- align=“center” bgcolor=ccffcc
| 65 || June 8 || @ Blue Jays || 6–0 || Greinke (7–2) || Sanchez (3–7) || — || 22,954 || 33–32 || W3
|- align=“center” bgcolor=ccffcc
| 66 || June 9 || @ Blue Jays || 8–2 || Ray (5–3) || Richard (0–2) || — || 19,661 || 34–32 || W4
|- align=“center” bgcolor=ccffcc
| 67 ||  June 10 || @ Phillies || 13–8 || Godley (3–4) || Eickhoff (3–4) || — || 26,255 || 35–32 || W5 
|- align=“center” bgcolor=ffbbbb
| 68 || June 11 || @ Phillies || 4–7 || Arrieta (6–5) || Duplantier (1–1) || Neris (14) || 26,321 || 35–33 || L1
|- align=“center” bgcolor=ccffcc
| 69 || June 12 || @ Phillies || 2–0 || Kelly (7–6) || Eflin (6–6) || Holland (10) || 29,047 || 36–33 || W1
|- align=“center” bgcolor=ccffcc
| 70 || June 13 || @ Nationals || 5–0 || Greinke (8–2) || Fedde (1–1) || — || 24,909 || 37–33 || W2
|- align=“center” bgcolor=ffbbbb
| 71 || June 14 || @ Nationals || 3–7 || Scherzer (5–5) || Ray (5–4) || — || 29,853 || 37–34 || L1
|- align=“center” bgcolor=ccffcc
| 72 || June 15 || @ Nationals || 10–3 || Hirano (3–3) || Strasburg (7–4) || — || 38,044 || 38–34 || W1
|- align=“center” bgcolor=ffbbbb
| 73 || June 16 || @ Nationals || 5–15 || Sánchez (3–6) || Bradley (2–4) || — || 29,032 || 38–35 || L1
|- align=“center” bgcolor=ffbbbb
| 74 || June 18 || Rockies || 1–8 || Senzatela (6–5) || Kelly (7–7) || — || 22,954 || 38–36 || L2
|- align=“center” bgcolor=ffbbbb
| 75 || June 19 || Rockies || 4–6 || Gray (7–5) || Greinke (8–3) || Davis (9) || 21,773 || 38–37 || L3
|- align=“center” bgcolor=ffbbbb
| 76 || June 20 || Rockies || 4–6 || Oberg (5–0) || Hirano (3–4) || — || 23,294 || 38–38 || L4
|- align=“center” bgcolor=ffbbbb
| 77 || June 21 || Giants || 5–11 || Samardzija (4–6) || Clarke (1–3) || — || 29,312 || 38–39 || L5
|- align=“center” bgcolor=ffbbbb
| 78 || June 22 || Giants || 4–7 || Gott (4–0) || Godley (3–5) || Smith (20) || 32,082 || 38–40 || L6
|- align=“center” bgcolor=ccffcc
| 79 || June 23 || Giants || 3–2  || Andriese (4–4) || Melancon (3–2) || — || 25,071 || 39–40 || W1
|- align=“center” bgcolor=ccffcc
| 80 || June 24 || Dodgers || 8–5 || López (1–1) || Floro (2–2) || Holland (11) || 24,675 || 40–40 || W2
|- align=“center” bgcolor=ffbbbb
| 81 || June 25 || Dodgers || 2–3 || Urías (4–2) || Ray (5–5) || Jansen (22) || 27,927 || 40–41 || L1
|- align=“center” bgcolor=ccffcc
| 82 || June 26 || Dodgers || 8–2 || Clarke (2–3) || Gonsolin (0–1) || — || 28,752 || 41–41 || W1
|- align=“center” bgcolor=ccffcc
| 83 || June 27 || @ Giants || 5–1 || Young (1–0) || Beede (1–3) || — || 30,790 || 42–41 || W2
|- align=“center” bgcolor=ffbbbb
| 84 || June 28 || @ Giants || 3–6 || Anderson (3–2) || Kelly (7–8) || — || 35,391 || 42–42 || L1
|- align=“center” bgcolor=ccffcc
| 85 || June 29 || @ Giants || 4–3 || Greinke (9–3) || Dyson (2–1) || Holland (12) || 31,600 || 43–42 || W1
|- align=“center” bgcolor=ffbbbb
| 86 || June 30 || @ Giants || 4–10 || Bumgarner (5–7) || Ray (5–6) || — || 31,778 || 43–43 || L1
|-

|- align=“center” bgcolor=ffbbbb
| 87 || July 2 || @ Dodgers || 4–5 || García (1–2) || Holland (1–1) || — || 52,969 || 43–44 || L2
|- align=“center” bgcolor=ffbbbb
| 88 || July 3 || @ Dodgers || 4–5  || Kelly (3–3) || López (1–2) || — || 53,327 || 43–45 || L3
|- align=“center” bgcolor=ccffcc
| 89 || July 5 || Rockies || 8–0 ||  Greinke (10–3) || Senzatela (7–6) || — || 43,056 || 44–45 || W1
|- align=“center” bgcolor=ccffcc
| 90 || July 6 || Rockies || 4–2 || Ray (6–6) || Gray (9–6) || Holland (13) || 28,276 || 45–45 || W2
|- align=“center” bgcolor=ccffcc
| 91 || July 7 || Rockies || 5–3 || Young (2–0) || Márquez (8–4) || Holland (14) || 22,964 || 46–45 || W3
|- align="center" bgcolor=bbcaff
| – || July 9 || colspan="9" | 90th All-Star Game in Cleveland, Ohio
|- align=“center” bgcolor=ccffcc
| 92 || July 12 || @ Cardinals || 4–2 || Ray (7–6) || Miller (3–4) || Holland (15) || 44,960 || 47–45 || W4
|- align=“center” bgcolor=ffbbbb
| 93 || July 13 || @ Cardinals || 2–4 || Hudson (8–4) || Kelly (7–9) || Martínez (4) || 46,152 || 47–46 || L1
|- align=“center” bgcolor=ffbbbb
| 94 || July 14 || @ Cardinals || 2–5 || Wainwright (6–7) || Greinke (10–4) || Martínez (5) || 43,439 || 47–47 || L2
|- align=“center” bgcolor=ccffcc
| 95 || July 16 || @ Rangers || 9–2 || Young (3–0) || Lynn (12–5) || — || 19,202 || 48–47 || W1
|- align=“center” bgcolor=ccffcc
| 96 || July 17 || @ Rangers || 19–4 || Ray (8–6) || Chavez (3–5) || — || 26,681 || 49–47 || W2
|- align=“center” bgcolor=ffbbbb
| 97 || July 18 || Brewers || 1–5 || Davies (8–2) || López (1–3) || — || 23,985 || 49–48 || L1
|- align=“center” bgcolor=ccffcc
| 98 || July 19 || Brewers || 10–7 || Bradley (3–4) || Chacín (3–10) || Holland (16) || 28,505 || 50–48 || W1
|- align=“center” bgcolor=ffbbbb
| 99 || July 20 || Brewers || 3–8 || Houser (3–4) || Chafin (0–2) || — || 38,567 || 50–49 || L1
|- align=“center” bgcolor=ffbbbb
| 100 || July 21 || Brewers || 4–7 || Peralta (4–3) || López (1–4) || Hader (22) || 33,111 || 50–50 || L2
|- align=“center” bgcolor=ccffcc
| 101 || July 22 || Orioles || 6–3 || Ray (9–6) || Brooks (2–4) || Holland (17) || 19,192 || 51–50 || W1
|- align=“center” bgcolor=ffbbbb
| 102 || July 23 || Orioles || 2–7 || Bundy (5–11) || Kelly (7–10) || — || 20,253 || 51–51 || L1
|- align=“center” bgcolor=ccffcc
| 103 || July 24 || Orioles || 5–2 || Clarke (3–3) || Means (8–6) || López (1) || 20,452 || 52–51 || W1
|- align=“center” bgcolor=ffbbbb
| 104 || July 26 || @ Marlins || 2–3 || Quijada (1–3) || Holland (1–2) || — || 8,867 || 52–52 || L1
|- align=“center” bgcolor=ccffcc
| 105 || July 27 || @ Marlins || 9–2 || Young (4–0) || Yamamoto (4–2) || — || 13,047 || 53–52 || W1
|- align=“center” bgcolor=ffbbbb
| 106 || July 28 || @ Marlins || 1–5 || Quijada (2–3) || Ray (9–7) || — || 11,538 || 53–53 || L1
|- align=“center” bgcolor=ffbbbb
| 107 || July 29 || @ Marlins || 6–11 || Smith (7–4) || Kelly (7–11) || — || 7,048 || 53–54 || L2
|- align=“center” bgcolor=ccffcc
| 108 || July 30 || @ Yankees || 4–2 || Clarke (4–3) || Happ (8–6) || Bradley (1) || 47,281 || 54–54 || W1
|- align=“center” bgcolor=ffbbbb
| 109 || July 31 || @ Yankees || 5–7 || Ottavino (4–3) || Hirano (3–5) || Chapman (27) || 43,979 || 54–55 || L1
|-

|- align=“center” bgcolor=ffbbbb
| 110 || August 2 || Nationals || 0–3 || Ross (1–3) || Young (4–1) || Doolittle (24) || 24,298 || 54–56 || L2
|- align=“center” bgcolor=ccffcc
| 111 || August 3 || Nationals || 18–7 || Ray (10–7) || Strasburg (14–5) || — || 33,966 || 55–56 || W1
|- align=“center” bgcolor=ccffcc
| 112 || August 4 || Nationals || 7–5 || Hirano (4–5) || Suero (3–6) || Bradley (2) || 22,976 || 56–56 || W2
|- align=“center” bgcolor=ffbbbb
| 113 || August 5 || Phillies || 3–7 || Velasquez (4–6) || Kelly (7–12) || — || 18,319 || 56–57 || L1
|- align=“center” bgcolor=ccffcc
| 114 || August 6 || Phillies || 8–4 || Chafin (1–2) || Suárez (3–1) || — || 17,446 || 57–57 || W1
|- align=“center” bgcolor=ccffcc
| 115 || August 7 || Phillies || 6–1 || Gallen (2–3) || Vargas (6–6) || — || 18,140 || 58–57 || W2
|- align=“center” bgcolor=ccffcc
| 116 || August 9 || @ Dodgers || 3–2  || Chafin (2–2) || Urías (4–3) || Bradley (3) || 49,538 || 59–57 || W3
|- align=“center” bgcolor=ffbbbb
| 117 || August 10 || @ Dodgers || 0–4 || Maeda (8–8) || Young (4–2) || — || 52,606 || 59–58 || L1
|- align=“center” bgcolor=ffbbbb
| 118 || August 11 || @ Dodgers || 3–9 || Ryu (12–2) || Leake (9–9) || — || 44,619 || 59–59 || L2
|- align=“center” bgcolor=ccffcc
| 119 || August 12 || @ Rockies || 8–6 || Kelly (8–12) || Bettis (1–6) || Bradley (4) || 32,160 || 60–59 || W1
|- align=“center” bgcolor=ccffcc
| 120 || August 13 || @ Rockies || 9–3 || Ginkel (1–0) || Hoffman (1–4) || — || 31,815 || 61–59 || W2
|- align=“center” bgcolor=ffbbbb
| 121 || August 14 || @ Rockies || 6–7 || Oberg (6–1) || Bradley (3–5) || — || 32,247 || 61–60 || L1 
|- align=“center” bgcolor=ffbbbb
| 122 || August 15 || Giants || 0–7 || Rodríguez (5–6) || Young (4–3) || — || 19,037 || 61–61 || L2
|- align=“center” bgcolor=ffbbbb
| 123 || August 16 || Giants || 9–10  || Smith (5–0) || López (1–5) || Gott (1) || 23,642 || 61–62 || L3
|- align=“center” bgcolor=ffbbbb
| 124 || August 17 || Giants || 6–11 || Webb (1–0) || Clarke (4–4) || — || 35,366 || 61–63 || L4
|- align=“center” bgcolor=ccffcc
| 125 || August 18 || Giants || 6–1 || Kelly (9–12) || Bumgarner (8–8) || — || 26,079 || 62–63 || W1
|- align=“center” bgcolor=ccffcc
| 126 || August 19 || Rockies || 5–3 || López (2–5) || Davis (1–6) || Bradley (5) || 15,443 || 63–63 || W2
|- align=“center” bgcolor=ccffcc
| 127 || August 20 || Rockies || 8–7 || Young (5–3) || Freeland (3–11) || Bradley (6) || 17,691 || 64–63 || W3
|- align=“center” bgcolor=ffbbbb
| 128 || August 21 || Rockies || 2–7 || Melville (1–0) || Leake (9–10) || — || 17,707 || 64–64 || L1
|- align=“center” bgcolor=ffbbbb
| 129 || August 23 || @ Brewers || 1–6 || Lyles (8–8) || Kelly (9–13) || — || 42,209 || 64–65 || L2
|- align=“center” bgcolor=ffbbbb
| 130 || August 24 || @ Brewers || 0–4 || Anderson (6–3) || Gallen (2–4) || — || 41,737 || 64–66 || L3
|- align=“center” bgcolor=ccffcc
| 131 || August 25 || @ Brewers || 5–2 || Ray (11–7) || Davies (8–7) || Bradley (7) || 38,920 || 65–66 || W1
|- align=“center” bgcolor=ccffcc
| 132 || August 26 || @ Giants || 6–4 || Young (6–3) || Beede (3–8) || Bradley (8) || 29,169 || 66–66 || W2
|- align=“center” bgcolor=ccffcc
| 133 || August 27 || @ Giants || 3–2 || Leake (10–10) || Coonrod (4–1) || Bradley (9) || 28,262 || 67–66 || W3 
|- align=“center” bgcolor=ccffcc
| 134 || August 29 || Dodgers || 11–5 || Andriese (5–4) || Ryu (12–5) || — || 22,581 || 68–66 || W4
|- align=“center” bgcolor=ccffcc
| 135 || August 30 || Dodgers || 5–4 || Bradley (4–5) || García (1–4) || — || 34,149 || 69–66 || W5
|- align=“center” bgcolor=ccffcc
| 136 || August 31 || Dodgers || 6–5 || Ray (12–7) || Kershaw (13–4) || Bradley (10) || 50,180 || 70–66 || W6
|-

|- style=“center” bgcolor=ffbbbb
| 137 || September 1 || Dodgers || 3–4 || Sadler (4–0) || Clarke (4–5) || Báez (1) || 34,439 || 70–67 || L1
|- align=“center” bgcolor=ccffcc
| 138 || September 2 || Padres || 14–7 || Leake (11–10) || Quantrill (6–6) || — || 23,477 || 71–67 || W1
|- align=“center” bgcolor=ccffcc
| 139 || September 3 || Padres || 2–1 || Kelly (10–13) || Bolaños (0–1) || Bradley (11) || 15,402 || 72–67 || W2
|- align=“center” bgcolor=ccffcc
| 140 || September 4 || Padres || 4–1 || Gallen (3–4) || Stammen (7–7) || Bradley (12) || 18,096 || 73–67 || W3
|- align=“center” bgcolor=ccffcc
| 141 || September 6 || @ Reds || 7–5 || Ginkel (2–0) || Mahle (2–11) || Bradley (13) || 19,048 || 74–67 || W4 
|- align=“center” bgcolor=ccffcc
| 142 || September 7 || @ Reds || 2–0 || Young (7–3) || Castillo (14–6) || Sherfy (1) || 34,804 || 75–67 || W5
|- style=“center” bgcolor=ffbbbb
| 143 || September 8 || @ Reds || 3–4 || Iglesias (3–11) || López (2–6) || — || 19,717 || 75–68 || L1
|- style=“center” bgcolor=ffbbbb
| 144 || September 9 || @ Mets || 1–3 || deGrom (9–8) || Kelly (10–14)  || Lugo (5) || 21,337 || 75–69 || L2
|- style=“center” bgcolor=ffbbbb
| 145 || September 10 || @ Mets || 2–3 || Wheeler (11–7) || Gallen (3–5) || Wilson (2) || 20,843 || 75–70 || L3
|- style=“center” bgcolor=ffbbbb
| 146 || September 11 || @ Mets || 0–9 || Matz (10–8) || Ray (12–8) || — || 21,841 || 75–71 || L4
|- style=“center” bgcolor=ffbbbb
| 147 || September 12 || @ Mets || 1–11 || Stroman (8–13) || Young (7–4) || — || 21,856 || 75–72 || L5
|- style=“center” bgcolor=ffbbbb
| 148 || September 13 || Reds || 3–4 || Castillo (15–6) || Leake (11–11) || Iglesias (30) || 35,158 || 75–73 || L6
|- align=“center” bgcolor=ccffcc
| 149 || September 14 || Reds || 1–0 || Kelly (11–14) || DeSclafani (9–9) || Bradley (14) || 35,151 || 76–73 || W1
|- style=“center” bgcolor=ffbbbb
| 150 || September 15 || Reds || 1–3 || Bauer (11–12) || Gallen (3–6) || Iglesias (31) || 25,193 || 76–74 || L1
|- align=“center” bgcolor=ccffcc
| 151 || September 16 || Marlins || 7–5 || Hirano (5–5) || Guerrero (1–2) || Ginkel (1) || 15,897 || 77–74 || W1
|- style=“center” bgcolor=ffbbbb
| 152 || September 17 || Marlins || 6–12 || Smith (9–10) || Andriese (5–5) || — || 19,745 || 77–75 || L1
|- align=“center” bgcolor=ccffcc
| 153 || September 18 || Marlins || 5–4 || Leake (12–11) || Alcantara (5–14) || Bradley (15) || 17,731 || 78–75 || W1
|- align=“center” bgcolor=ccffcc
| 154 || September 20 || @ Padres || 9–0 || Kelly (12–14) || Lauer (8–10) || — || 27,023 || 79–75 || W2
|- align=“center” bgcolor=ccffcc
| 155 || September 21 || @ Padres || 4–2 || Clarke (5–5) || Strahm (5–10) || Bradley (16) || 30,191 || 80–75 || W3
|- style=“center” bgcolor=ffbbbb
| 156 || September 22 || @ Padres || 4–6  || Strahm (6–10) || López (2–7) || — || 31,293 || 80–76 || L1
|- style=“center” bgcolor=ffbbbb
| 157 || September 23 || Cardinals || 7–9 || Wainwright (14–9) || Young (7–5) || Martínez (24) || 24,826 || 80–77 || L2
|- align=“center” bgcolor=ccffcc
| 158 || September 24 || Cardinals || 3–2  ||  Ginkel (3–0) || Brebbia (3–4) || — || 26,097 || 81–77 || W1
|- align=“center” bgcolor=ccffcc
| 159 || September 25 || Cardinals || 9–7 || Kelly (13–14) || Fernández (0–1) || Bradley (17) || 21,420 || 82–77 || W2
|- style=“center” bgcolor=ccffcc
| 160 || September 27 || Padres || 6–3 || Scott (1–0) || Perdomo (2–4) || Bradley (18) || 32,244 || 83–77 || W3
|- style=“center” bgcolor=ccffcc
| 161 || September 28 || Padres || 6–5 || Sherfy (1–0) || Bednar (0–2) || Ginkel (2) || 46,477 || 84–77 || W4
|- style=“center” bgcolor=ccffcc
| 162 || September 29 || Padres || 1–0 || Crichton (1–0) || Strahm (6–11) || — || 45,446 || 85–77 || W5
|-

|-
| Legend:       = Win       = Loss       = PostponementBold = Diamondbacks team member

Roster

Minor league affiliations

References

External links
2019 Arizona Diamondbacks season at Baseball Reference

Arizona Diamondbacks
Arizona Diamondbacks
Arizona Diamondbacks seasons